This is a list of ambassadors of Singapore to the Lao People's Democratic Republic

References

External links
 Embassy of Singapore in Lao People's Democratic Republic

Lao People's Democratic Republic
Singapore